Haiti competed at the 1988 Summer Olympics in Seoul, South Korea. Haiti's delegation consisted of four competitors and one official.

Competitors
The following is the list of number of competitors in the Games.

Results by event

Athletics

Men's 100 meters
 Claude Roumain
 Round 1 — 11.22 seconds (→ did not advance)

Men's 200 meters
 Claude Roumain
 Round 1 — 22.60 seconds (→ did not advance)

Men's Marathon
 Dieudonné Lamothe — 2:16:15 (→ 20th place)

Women's Shot Put
 Deborah Saint-Phard
 Qualification — 16.02 m (→ did not advance)

Tennis
Men's Singles
 Ronald Agénor
 Round 1 — Lost to Leonardo Lavalle of Mexico (→ did not advance)

References

Nations at the 1988 Summer Olympics
1988
summer Olympics